James Brown Scott, J.U.D. (June 3, 1866 – June 25, 1943) was an American authority on international law.

Early life
Scott was born at Kincardine, Ontario, Canada.  He was educated at Harvard University (A.B., 1890; A.M., 1891).  As Parker fellow of Harvard he traveled in Europe and studied in Berlin, Heidelberg (J.U.D.), and Paris.

Career
Following his return to the United States, Scott practiced law at Los Angeles, California  from 1894 to 1899. He founded the law school at the University of Southern California, and was its dean, though his participation in the Spanish–American War interrupted that role. He was dean of the college of law at the University of Illinois (1899–1903), professor of law at Columbia, and professor of law at George Washington University (1905–06). In 1907 he was expert on international law to the United States delegation at the Second Hague Peace Conference. He also served on a State Department commission which made recommendations to Congress on the reform of United States nationality law, which would result in the Expatriation Act of 1907.

In 1909 Professor Scott lectured at Johns Hopkins. He served as secretary of the Carnegie Endowment for International Peace, and wrote several works on the Hague Conferences of 1899 and 1907 (1908, 1909, 1915). Besides serving as editor in chief of  the American Journal of International Law and as editor of the American Case Book, and writing numerous articles on international law and the peace movement.

He also was the champion of the Spanish school of international law of the 16th century, claiming that writers like Francisco de Vitoria and Suarez had already said about that department of the law what about a century later was stated by Hugo de Groot in his De iure belli ac pacis (About the law of war and peace).

Works

 .
 .
 .
 .
 .
 .
 .

Notes

References

Further reading

External links
 
 

American male journalists
American legal writers
Canadian emigrants to the United States
Harvard University alumni
Columbia University faculty
George Washington University faculty
University of Illinois Urbana-Champaign faculty
People from Bruce County
People of the Spanish–American War
1866 births
1943 deaths
International law scholars
Carnegie Endowment for International Peace
American Journal of International Law editors
Presidents of the American Society of International Law